The Obelisco de Buenos Aires (Obelisk of Buenos Aires) is a national historic monument and icon of Buenos Aires. Located in the Plaza de la República in the intersection of avenues Corrientes and 9 de Julio, it was erected in 1936 to commemorate the quadricentennial of the first foundation of the city.

History

Construction began on March 20, 1936, and it was finished on May 23 of the same year. It was designed by architect Alberto Prebisch (one of the main architects of the Argentine modernism who also designed the Teatro Gran Rex, in Corrientes and Suipacha) at the request of the mayor Mariano de Vedia y Mitre (appointed by president Agustín Pedro Justo).

The obelisk was built by the German company G.E.O.P.E. - Siemens Bauunion - Grün & Bilfinger, which completed its work in a record time of 31 days, with 157 workers.

It has only one entrance (on its west side) and on its top there are four windows, that can only be reached by a straight staircase of 206 steps with 7 breaks every .

On February 20, 1938, Roberto María Ortiz succeeded Justo as President and appointed Arturo Goyeneche as the new mayor of the city. In June 1939 the City Council sanctioned the demolition of the Obelisco, citing economic, aesthetic and public safety reasons. However, the ordinance was vetoed by the municipal executive power, characterizing it as an act without merit and juridical content, because it alters the state of things emanated by the executive power, and that it was a monument under the jurisdiction and custody of the Nation and is part of its heritage. 

Where the Obelisk stands, there was a church dedicated to St. Nicholas of Bari; it was demolished. In that church the Argentine flag was officially hoisted for the first time in Buenos Aires, in 1812. That fact is noted in one of the inscriptions on the north side of the monument.

As a result of the detachments of sheets of stone covering, which occurred on the night of June 20–21, 1938, the day after a public event with the presence of president Ortiz took place there. It was decided to remove such cladding in 1943 and was replaced by another one made of polished cement, making cracks to simulate the joints of the stones. When the slabs were removed, a legend that said "Its architect was Alberto Prebisch" was also removed.

In 1973, it was decorated as a Christmas tree. In 1975, during the Peronist government of Isabel Perón, a ring-shaped rotating sign was hung around the obelisk, with the motto El silencio es salud (Silence is health). Although it was allegedly geared against motorists creating excessive noise, it was widely interpreted as a statement calling Argentines to refrain from expressing their political views.

Throughout its history, the monument has suffered vandalism, especially politically oriented graffiti. In the 1980s, an activist group broke in and spilled paint from the top windows, causing the city government to erect a fence around its base in 1987. This move stirred controversy, but eventually proved effective in reducing the number of defacing incidents.

On 1 November 2005 it was announced that a comprehensive restoration, financed by the Argentine painting and restoration industry association (Ceprara), was finished. The monument was painted with 90-micrometre acrylic paint to a "Paris stone" hue, deemed more pleasant than the previously used white.

On December 1, 2005, the obelisk was covered by a giant pink condom to commemorate the World AIDS Day.

To commemorate the 30th anniversary of the La Noche de los Lápices, the monument was converted into a giant pencil.

Lines B, C, and D of the Buenos Aires Metro have stations near the monument, and are connected by a number of underground passages with commercial galleries.

The Obelisco hosted the opening ceremony of the 2018 Summer Youth Olympics.

Inscriptions on its sides 

At the base of the south face, in a very small rectangle, this sonnet written by Baldomero Fernández Moreno during a tribute dinner in the Alvear Palace Hotel to Prebisch:

El Obelisco

¿Donde tenía la ciudad guardada
esta espada de plata refulgente
desenvainada repentinamente
y a los cielos azules asestada?

Ahora puede lanzarse la mirada
harta de andar rastrera y penitente
piedra arriba hacia el Sol omnipotente
y descender espiritualizada.

Rayo de luna o desgarrón de viento
en símbolo cuajado y monumento
índice, surtidor, llama, palmera.

La estrella arriba y la centella abajo,
que la idea, el ensueño y el trabajo
giren a tus pies, devanadera.

Special occasions

See also

 Obelisk of São Paulo
 Washington Monument

References

https://web.archive.org/web/20100603194157/http://otrosmovil.clarin.com/ciudades/capital_federal/Luces-colores-cambian-entorno-Obelisco_0_271772976.html
https://web.archive.org/web/20110706083419/http://bsas.gov.ar/areas/med_ambiente/obelisco_01.php

External links

 Article on  restoration
 Google Maps

Buildings and structures completed in 1936
National Historic Monuments of Argentina
Obelisks in Argentina
Terminating vistas
Tourist attractions in Buenos Aires
Monuments and memorials in Buenos Aires
San Nicolás, Buenos Aires